Faisalabad District (Lyallpur District until 1979) (Punjabi and ) is one of the districts of Punjab province, Pakistan. According to the 1998 census of Pakistan it had a population of 3,029,547 of which almost 42% were in Faisalabad City. It is the third largest city of Pakistan after Karachi and Lahore.

After the independence of Pakistan in 1947, the Muslim refugees from Eastern Punjab and Haryana settled in the Faisalabad District. It initially lacked industry, hospitals and universities. Since independence, there has been industrial growth, and the city's population is continually growing. Notable industry in the district include but not limited to Textile (spinning, weaving, printing, dying, stitching), Chemicals (acids, caustics, industrial gases, potash, chlorides, etc.), consumer goods (soaps, vegetable oil, detergents), Engineering (light electrical equipment, engineering goods), Metals & Metallurgy (steels, alloys) and Power (power equipment, power production).

Initially a part of Jhang District, it gained the status of a separate district in 1904. In 1982 Toba Tek Singh District (until then a Tehsil of Faisalabad District) was created as a separate district from Faisalabad. , it is a City-District consisting of the city of Faisalabad and its surrounding areas.

Administrative divisions
Faisalabad District is part of Faisalabad Division.

In 2005 Faisalabad was reorganized as a City-District. It comprises six Tehsils.

 Chak Jhumra
 Faisalabad City
 Faisalabad Sadar
 Jaranwala
 Samundri
 Tandlianwala

Demographics 
At the time of the 2017 census the district had a population of 7,882,444, of which 4,038,932 were males and 3,842,684 females. Rural population is 4,115,578 while the urban population is 3,766,866. The literacy rate was 69.83%.

Religion 
As per the 2017 census, Muslims were the predominant religious community with 96.49% of the population while Christians were 3.36% of the population.

Language 
At the time of the 2017 census, 96.48% of the population spoke Punjabi and 2.02% Urdu as their first language.

Transportation

Road

Rail

Air

Education 
Punjab Group of Colleges (Girls Campus) Service Road

Punjab Group of Colleges (Boys Campus) Service Road

Government College University Faisalabd 
 
Agriculture university Faisalabad.

See also

 Faisalabad Division
 Faisalabad Arts Council
 Khanewal–Wazirabad Branch Line
 Gatwala Wildlife Park
 Iqbal Stadium

References

External links 

 Faisalabad City District
 Punjab Government website
 Faisalabad District - profile on Dawn.com

 
Faisalabad
Districts of Punjab, Pakistan